Lutz Fischer-Lamprecht (born November 1, 1967 in Karlsruhe, resident in Wettingen) is a Swiss pastor and politician (EPP). He is a member of the Grand Council of the Canton of Aargau.

Life and work 
Fischer-Lamprecht was born as Lutz Fischer, grew up in Stutensee and attended school there. His father is Werner Fischer, one of his two brothers is Axel Fischer. After graduating from the Thomas-Mann-Gymnasium Stutensee, he studied protestant theology in Neuendettelsau, Marburg and Munich. From 1995 to 1997 he was vicar in Sandhausen, after which he worked as a self-employed insurance advisor until the end of 1998 and completed his training as an insurance specialist (BWV). He held his first pastoral position in Rechthalten in the Canton of Fribourg and was ordained Verbi Divini Minster (VDM) by the Evangelical Reformed Church of the canton of Fribourg on July 2, 2000. In August 2002 he joined the Aargau. There he was reformed pastor in Birmenstorf until March 2008, and since then he has been active in the Reformed parish of Wettingen-Neuenhof. Fischer-Lamprecht also has a CAS in business administration for non-business administrators from the University of Applied Sciences Northwestern Switzerland.

Politics 
Fischer-Lamprecht has been a member of the EPP since 2009. The Grand Council elections on October 23 2016 he brought in the district of Baden, the second most votes of the candidates of the EPP-list. After the resignation of Lilian Studer, who was elected to the Swiss parliament in October 2019, he moved up to the Grand Council on November 19, 2019. He was confirmed in office in the elections on October 18, 2020.

References 

Fischer
1967 births
Living people
21st-century Swiss politicians
People from Baden District, Aargau